Rotten is a 1994 autobiographical book by John Lydon, co-authored by Keith Zimmerman and Kent Zimmerman. The book was named one of the 35 best rock memoirs by Rolling Stone magazine.

Overview
Rotten chronicles the life of John Lydon aka "Johnny Rotten", lead singer of the Sex Pistols and PiL.

In the book Lydon expresses condemnation towards former Sex Pistols, Malcolm McLaren, hippies, rich people, racists, sexists and the UK political system. He says that "A lot of people feel the Sex Pistols were just negative. I agree, and what the fuck is wrong with that? Sometimes the absolute most positive thing you can be in a boring society is completely negative."

References

External links
Google Books

1994 non-fiction books
Books about rock music
Music autobiographies
Collaborative autobiographies
British autobiographies